Aliuşağı (also, Əliuşağı, Aliushagy, and Alyushagy) is a village and municipality in the Samukh Rayon of Azerbaijan.  It has a population of 1,672.

References 

Populated places in Samukh District